= Concord Spirit Poles =

Public art project

The Concord Spirit Poles were a controversial public art project installed in the Bay Area city of Concord, California in 1989, at the direction of artist Gary Rieveschl, at a cost of approximately $100,000. They stretched along the median near downtown on Concord Ave. Rieveschl has said that the poles signify "our increasing interdependence in an electronic age of digitized information." The pointed aluminum rods ranged from 8 to 50 feet in height and weighed as much as 100 pounds each, prompting residents of the suburban bedroom community to object to their harsh appearance. The city used the poles to hang banners and flags in an unsuccessful attempt to soften the sculpture's look. The Spirit Poles ultimately became unstable and cracked, with one toppling during a windstorm. The Concord City Council voted in 1999 to remove the Spirit Poles.
